Snowden Branch is a stream in Madison County in the U.S. state of Missouri. It is a tributary of Indian Creek.

Snowden Branch has the name of Professor J. F. Snowden, the original owner of the site.

See also
List of rivers of Missouri

References

Rivers of Madison County, Missouri
Rivers of Missouri